The 6th constituency of Paris (French: Sixième circonscription de Paris) is a French legislative constituency in the department of Paris. Like the other 576 French constituencies, it elects one member of the National Assembly using the two-round system. Its boundaries were heavily redrawn in 1988 and 2012. It was the constituency of Maurice Couve de Murville, who served as Prime Minister of France from 1968 to 1969 under President Charles de Gaulle. In the 2022 legislative election, Sophia Chikirou of La France Insoumise (LFI) was elected.

Deputies

Election results

2022

 
 
 
 
 
 
 
|-
| colspan="8" bgcolor="#E9E9E9"|
|-
 
 
 
 

Sophia Chikirou won in first round.

2017

 
 
 
 
 
 
 
|-
| colspan="8" bgcolor="#E9E9E9"|
|-

2012

 
 
 
 
 
|-
| colspan="8" bgcolor="#E9E9E9"|
|-

2007
Elections between 1988 and 2007 were based on the 1988 boundaries.

 
 
 
 
 
 
 
|-
| colspan="8" bgcolor="#E9E9E9"|
|-

2002

 
 
 
 
 
 
 
 
 
|-
| colspan="8" bgcolor="#E9E9E9"|
|-

1997

 
 
 
 
 
 
 
 
|-
| colspan="8" bgcolor="#E9E9E9"|
|-

References

 French Interior Ministry results website: 

6